Joseph Charles Watson was an Australian rules footballer.

References

Australian rules footballers from South Australia
Port Adelaide Football Club (SANFL) players
Port Adelaide Football Club players (all competitions)